Emma Claudia Castellanos (formerly called Claudia Yadira Inés Rodríguez de Castellanos) is a Colombian Evangelical pastor of the International Charismatic Mission megachurch and politician. She is married to the also Evangelical pastor César Castellanos Domínguez. She was twice elected to the Senate of Colombia, first from 1991 to 1994, and again from 2006 to 2010; she also was appointed as Ambassador of Colombia to Brazil by her political sponsor at the time, from 2004 to 2005.

Controversies 
She has been the subject of controversy in her political career for being constantly absent in Congress and was disciplinary investigated by the Attorney General's Office "for not supporting in a timely manner the excuse presented", "for failing to attend without a valid excuse" and "for not attending and not presenting an excuse to sessions".

Regarding her diplomatic work as ambassador in Brazil, her subordinates at the Embassy gave complaints before the Attorney General's Office of her abandoning diplomatic obligations and dedicating herself to church duties instead; during the eight months in which she remained as ambassador, she accumulated a dossier of complaints that was delivered to the Foreign Ministry, however, in 2013 she received a medal by then-Senator Claudia Wilches, whom he politically sponsors and is part of the team of pastors of the International Charismatic Mission.

In 2007 she was investigated for an unjustified increase in her assets due to inconsistencies found by the Prosecutor's Office in the accounting of the senator and her husband, Pastor César Castellanos; she could not justify part of the money that they found for the couple and that was in her name; the case was referred to the Supreme Court.

Selected works

References

Living people
Politicians from Bogotá
Colombian evangelicals
Colombian women in politics
Colombian women lawyers
Members of the Senate of Colombia
Ambassadors of Colombia to Brazil
Social Party of National Unity politicians
Colombian women ambassadors
Year of birth missing (living people)